Five Day Lover is a 1961 French sex comedy film directed by Philippe de Broca, starring Jean Seberg and Micheline Presle. It is based on the 1959 novel L'amant de cinq jours by Françoise Parturier. The film was entered into the 11th Berlin International Film Festival and nominated for the Golden Bear.

Plot
Claire (Jean Seberg), a young Englishwoman, lives in Paris with her staid husband, Georges (François Périer), a government archivist, and their two small children. One day, while attending a fashion show mounted by her friend Madeleine (Micheline Presle), a couturière, Claire meets a lighthearted young Frenchman, Antoine (Jean-Pierre Cassel). Despite the fact that he is being kept by Madeleine, Claire responds to his advances and returns with him to his luxurious bachelor apartment. Before long she is visiting him five afternoons a week; evenings and weekends are reserved for Georges and the children. Madeleine, strong-willed and possessive, learns of the affair and decides to meet the situation directly by inviting Claire and Georges, as well as Antoine, to the same party. The desired effect is achieved when it becomes apparent that Claire is tiring of Antoine and has no intention of seeing him again. Only Georges, quiet and gentle, understands that nothing has really changed. It will not be long before Claire will once more embark on her quest for chance lovers.

Cast
 Jean Seberg as Claire
 Micheline Presle as Madeleine
 Jean-Pierre Cassel as Antoine
 François Périer as Georges
 Carlo Croccolo as Marius
 Claude Mansard as Une invité
 Albert Michel as Blanchet
 Albert Mouton as Halavoine
 Marcella Rovena as Madame Chanut
 Sylvain as Le maître (as Jean Sylvain)
 Pierre Repp as Pepere
 Gib Grossac as Taxiste

Filming locations
The film was shot in Paris, France, partly in Grand Trianon.

Awards
The film was entered into the 11th Berlin International Film Festival and nominated for the Golden Bear, the ceremony's highest honor. It lost the prize to Michelangelo Antonioni's La Notte.

References

External links

1961 films
1960s sex comedy films
French sex comedy films
1960s French-language films
French black-and-white films
Films scored by Georges Delerue
Films directed by Philippe de Broca
Adultery in films
1961 comedy films
1960s French films